Bobby Sheehan or Robert Sheehan may refer to:

Bobby Sheehan (musician) (1968–1999), American musician and songwriter
Bobby Sheehan (ice hockey) (born 1949), retired National Hockey League center
Robert Sheehan (born 1988), Irish actor
Robert F. Sheehan (1922–1969), American photographer

See also
Sheehan (disambiguation)